Ketley railway station was a station in Ketley, Shropshire, England. The station was opened in 1859 and closed in 1962.

References

Further reading

Disused railway stations in Shropshire
Railway stations in Great Britain opened in 1859
Railway stations in Great Britain closed in 1962
Former Great Western Railway stations